Actaeon (Aktaion), in Greek mythology, son of the priestly herdsman Aristaeus and Autonoe in Boeotia, was a famous Theban hero. Like Achilles in a later generation, he was trained by the centaur Chiron.

He fell to the fatal wrath of Artemis, but the surviving details of his transgression vary: "the only certainty is in what Aktaion suffered, his pathos, and what Artemis did: the hunter became the hunted; he was transformed into a stag, and his raging hounds, struck with a 'wolf's frenzy' (Lyssa), tore him apart as they would a stag." This is the iconic motif by which Actaeon is recognized, both in ancient art and in Renaissance and post-Renaissance depictions.

The plot

Among others, John Heath has observed, "The unalterable kernel of the tale was a hunter's transformation into a deer and his death in the jaws of his hunting dogs. But authors were free to suggest different motives for his death."  In the version that was offered by the Hellenistic poet Callimachus, which has become the standard setting, Artemis was bathing in the woods when the hunter Actaeon stumbled across her, thus seeing her naked. He stopped and stared, amazed at her ravishing beauty. Once seen, Artemis got revenge on Actaeon: she forbade him speech — if he tried to speak, he would be changed into a stag — for the unlucky profanation of her virginity's mystery.

Upon hearing the call of his hunting party, he cried out to them and immediately transformed. At this he fled deep into the woods, and doing so he came upon a pond and, seeing his reflection, groaned. His own hounds then turned upon him and pursued him, not recognizing him. In an endeavour to save himself, he raised his eyes (and would have raised his arms, had he had them) toward Mount Olympus. The gods did not heed his plea, and he was torn to pieces. An element of the earlier myth made Actaeon the familiar hunting companion of Artemis, no stranger. In an embroidered extension of the myth, the hounds were so upset with their master's death, that Chiron made a statue so lifelike that the hounds thought it was Actaeon.

There are various other versions of his transgression: The Hesiodic Catalogue of Women and pseudo-Apollodoran Bibliotheke state that his offense was that he was a rival of Zeus for Semele, his mother's sister, whereas in Euripides' Bacchae he has boasted that he is a better hunter than Artemis:
Further materials, including fragments that belong with the Hesiodic Catalogue of Women and at least four Attic tragedies, including a Toxotides  of Aeschylus, have been lost. Diodorus Siculus (4.81.4), in a variant of Actaeon's hubris that has been largely ignored, has it that Actaeon wanted to marry Artemis. Other authors say the hounds were Artemis' own; some lost elaborations of the myth seem to have given them all names and narrated their wanderings after his loss.

According to the Latin version of the story told by the Roman Ovid having accidentally seen Diana (Artemis) on Mount Cithaeron while she was bathing, he was changed by her into a stag, and pursued and killed by his fifty hounds. This version also appears in Callimachus' Fifth Hymn, as a mythical parallel to the blinding of Tiresias after he sees Athena bathing.

The literary testimony of Actaeon's myth is largely lost, but Lamar Ronald Lacy, deconstructing the myth elements in what survives and supplementing it by iconographic evidence in late vase-painting, made a plausible reconstruction of an ancient Actaeon myth that Greek poets may have inherited and subjected to expansion and dismemberment. His reconstruction opposes a too-pat consensus that has an archaic Actaeon aspiring to Semele, a classical Actaeon boasting of his hunting prowess and a Hellenistic Actaeon glimpsing Artemis' bath. Lacy identifies the site of Actaeon's transgression as a spring sacred to Artemis at Plataea where Actaeon was a  hero archegetes ("hero-founder") The righteous hunter, the companion of Artemis, seeing her bathing naked in the spring, was moved to try to make himself her consort, as Diodorus Siculus noted, and was punished, in part for transgressing the hunter's "ritually enforced deference to Artemis" (Lacy 1990:42).

Names of dogs 

Notes:

 Names of dogs were verified to correspond to the list given in Ovid's text where the names were already transliterated.
 ? = Seven listed names of dogs in Hyginus' Fabulae, was probably misread or misinterpreted by later authors because it does not correspond to the exact numbers and names given by Ovid:
 Arcas signifies Arcadia, place of origin of three dogs namely Pamphagos, Dorceus and Oribasus
 Cyprius means Cyprus, where the dogs Lysisca and Harpalos originated
 Gnosius can be read as Knossus in Crete, which signify that Ichnobates was a Knossian breed of dog
 Echnobas, Elion, Aura and Therodanapis were probably place names or adjectives defining the characteristics of dogs

The "bed of Actaeon"
In the second century AD, the traveller Pausanias was shown a spring on the road in Attica leading to Plataea from Eleutherae, just beyond Megara "and a little farther on a rock. It is called the bed of Actaeon, for it is said that he slept thereon when weary with hunting and that into this spring he looked while Artemis was bathing in it."

Parallels in Akkadian and Ugarit poems
In the standard version of the Epic of Gilgamesh (tablet vi) there is a parallel, in the series of examples Gilgamesh gives Ishtar of her mistreatment of her serial lovers:
You loved the herdsman, shepherd and chief shepherd                                                                                                                                                 Who was always heaping up the glowing ashes for you,                                                                                                                                       And cooked ewe-lambs for you every day.                                                                                                                                                               But you hit him and turned him into a wolf,                                                                                                                                                                      His own herd-boys hunt him down
And his dogs tear at his haunches. Actaeon, torn apart by dogs incited by Artemis, finds another Near Eastern parallel in the Ugaritic hero Aqht, torn apart by eagles incited by Anath who wanted his hunting bow.

The virginal Artemis of classical times is not directly comparable to Ishtar of the many lovers, but the mytheme of Artemis shooting Orion, was linked to her punishment of Actaeon by T.C.W. Stinton;<ref>Stinton "Euripides and the Judgement of Paris" (London, 1965:45 note 14) reprinted in Stinton, Collected Papers on Greek Tragedy (London, 1990:51 note 14).</ref> the Greek context of the mortal's reproach to the amorous goddess is translated to the episode of Anchises and Aphrodite. Daphnis too was a herdsman loved by a goddess and punished by her: see Theocritus' First Idyll.

Symbolism regarding Actaeon

In Greek Mythology, Actaeon is widely thought to symbolize ritual human sacrifice in attempt to please a God or Goddess: the dogs symbolize the sacrificers and Actaeon symbolizes the sacrifice.

Actaeon may symbolize human curiosity or irreverence.

The myth is seen by Jungian psychologist Wolfgang Giegerich as a symbol of spiritual transformation and/or enlightenment.

Actaeon often symbolizes a cuckold, as when he is turned into a stag, he becomes "horned". This is alluded to in Shakespeare's Merry Wives, Robert Burton's Anatomy of Melancholy, and others.Gordon Williams, A Dictionary of Sexual Language and Imagery in Shakespearean and Stuart Literature, 2001, p. 8-9

Cultural depictions

The two main scenes are Actaeon surprising Artemis/Diana, and his death.  In classical art Actaeon is normally shown as fully human, even as his hounds are killing him (sometimes he has small horns), but in Renaissance art he is often given a deer's head with antlers even in the scene with Diana, and by the time he is killed he has at the least this head, and has often completely transformed into the shape of a deer.

 Aeschylus and other tragic poets made use of the story, which was a favourite subject in ancient works of art.
 There is a well-known small marble group in the British Museum illustrative of the story, in gallery 83/84.
Two paintings by the 16th century painter Titian (Death of Actaeon and Diana and Actaeon).Actéon, an operatic pastorale by Marc-Antoine Charpentier.
 Percy Bysshe Shelley suggests a parallel between his alter-ego and Actaeon in his elegy for John Keats, Adonais, stanza 31 ('[he] had gazed on Nature's naked loveliness/ Actaeon-like, and now he fled astray/ .../ And his own thoughts, along that rugged way,/ Pursued, like raging hounds, their father and their prey.')
 The aria "Oft she visits this lone mountain" from Purcell's Dido and Aeneas, first performed in 1689 or earlier.
 Giordano Bruno, "Gli Eroici Furori".
 In canto V of Giambattista Marino's poem "Adone" the protagonist goes to theater to see a tragedy representing the myth of Actaeon. This episode foreshadows the protagonist's violent death at the end of the book.
 In Act I Scene 2 of Jacques Offenbach's Orpheus in the Underworld, Actaeon is Diana (Artemis)'s lover, and it is Jupiter who turns him into a stag, which puts Diana off hunting. His story is relinquished at this point, in favour of the other plots.
 Ted Hughes wrote a version of the story in his Tales from Ovid.
 In Alexandre Dumas' novel La Reine Margot, Charles IX of France, fond of the hunt, has a much-loved and ill-fated hunting dog named Actaeon.
 Diane and Actéon Pas de Deux from Marius Petipa's ballet, Le Roi Candaule, to the music by Riccardo Drigo and Cesare Pugni, later incorporated into the second act of La Esmeralda (ballet).
 In Twelfth Night by William Shakespeare, Orsino compares his unrequited love for Olivia to the fate of Actaeon. "O, when mine eyes did see Olivia first, Methought she purged the air of pestilence, That instant was I turned into a hart, and my desires like fell and cruel hounds e'er since pursue me." Act 1 Scene 1.
 In Christopher Marlowe's play Edward II, courtier Piers Gaveston seeks to entertain his lover, King Edward II of England, by presenting a play based on the Actaeon myth. In Gaveston's version, Diane is played by a naked boy holding an olive branch to hide his loins, and it is  the boy-Diane who transforms Actaeon into a hart and lets him be devoured by the hounds. Thus,  Gaveston's (and Marlowe's) interpretation adds a strong element of homoeroticism, absent from the original myth.    
Paul Manship in 1925 created a set of copper statute of Diane and Actaeon, which in the Luce Lunder Smithsonian Institution.
 Diana at Her Bath by Pierre Klossovski (1956)
 Aktaion Energy is the name of a local conglomerate with ties to the Dome event and The Hounds of Diana is a Dome conspiracy/Aktaion Energy watchdog website run by a member of Aktaion's IT department who goes by the alias Dromas.
 French based collective LFKs and his film/theatre director, writer and visual artist Jean Michel Bruyere produced a series of 600 shorts and "medium" films, an interactive 360° installation, Si poteris narrare licet ("if you are able to speak of it, then you may do so") in 2002, a 3D 360° installation La Dispersion du Fils (from 2008 to 2016) and an outdoor performance, "Une Brutalité pastorale" (2000) all about the myth of Diana and Actaeon.
Actaeon and his dogs make an appearance in Diana Wynne Jones's novel The Game, in which the main character encounters various mythological figures while wandering the mythosphere.
The Actaeon myth is incorporated into Rachael Craw's 2018 novel The Rift.
In Matthew Barney's 2019 movie Redoubt set in the Sawtooth Mountains of the U.S. state of Idaho and an accompanying traveling art exhibition originating at the Yale University Art Gallery the myth is retold by the visual artist and filmmaker via avenues of his own design.
Symphonic poem (1915) by the Romanian composer & conductor Alfred Alessandrescu (1893-1959).

Royal House of Thebes family tree

Notes

ReferencesThe Oxford Classical Dictionary, s.v. "Actaeon".
Ovid, Metamorphoses, 3.138ff.
Euripides, Bacchae'', 337–340.
Diodorus Siculus, 4.81.4.

External links

 The Warburg Institute Iconographic Database: ca 230 images of Actaeon 
 Actaeon by Fabio F. Centamore

Deaths due to dog attacks
Mythological Greek archers
Metamorphoses characters
Metamorphoses into animals in Greek mythology
Deeds of Artemis
Deeds of Zeus
Dogs in art
Inanna
Anat